Jane Johnson may refer to:
 Jane Johnson (actress) (1706–1733), English actress
Jane Johnson (slave) (c. 1814–1872), American slave who was center of a precedent-setting legal case
Jane Johnson (writer) (born 1960), English author
Jane Clayson Johnson (born 1967), American journalist

See also
Jane Johnston Schoolcraft (1800–1842), aka Jane Johnston, first American Indian literary writer